Pieces of Eight: Live at UCLA is a live double CD by trumpeter/bandleader Don Ellis' Octet recorded in 1967 and released on the Wounded Bird label in 2006.

Reception

Rob Theakston of Allmusic said "The highlights are no doubt Ellis' fascination with difficult rhythmic combinations and manic fluctuations of odd time signatures and his band, surprisingly, performs most of the material with great fluidity. There's also a surprising amount of microtonality from the players as well. Fans of Ellis' work will no doubt revel in these compositions and what is essentially a "new" recording from a truly groundbreaking composer". On All About Jazz, Jim Santella observed "While unusual meters dot the session, Ellis gives a well rounded performance that combines creative soloing and pure musical timbres with superior writing. His sidemen were always inspired. Pieces Of Eight comes highly recommended for its unique character and for its dedication to the timeless principles of great music"

Track listing 
All compositions by Don Ellis except as indicated

Disc One:
 "Slippin' 'N' Slidin'" - 6:57		
 "Sadness Shouldn't Go so Deep" - 3:54		
 "Bali Dancer" - 5:31		
 "With Respect to Coltrane" (Tom Scott) - 5:05		
 "Pete's 7" - 6:29		
 "Let's Go to Sleep" - 7:16		
 "Blues for Hari" (Scott) - 9:08

Disc Two:
 "Milestones" (Miles Davis) - 9:56		
 "It's a Snap" - 2:18		
 "I Love Us" - 5:47
 "The Squeeze" - 5:22
 "Lush Life" (Billy Strayhorn) - 7:29		
 "Turk's Works" (Arif Mardin) - 18:25

Personnel 
Don Ellis - trumpet, arranger
Tom Scott – alto saxophone, tenor saxophone, clarinet, arranger
Dave Wells – trombone
Dave Mackay – piano
Ray Neopolitan – bass
Steve Bohannon – drums
Alan Estes - timbales, percussion
Chino Valdes - congas, bongos

References 

Don Ellis live albums
2005 live albums
Wounded Bird Records albums